Evgeni Krasilnikov (7 April 1965 – 6 March 2014) was a Russian former volleyball player who competed for the Soviet Union in the 1988 Summer Olympics and for the Unified Team in the 1992 Summer Olympics.

In 1988 he was part of the Soviet team which won the silver medal in the Olympic tournament. He played one match.

Four years later he finished seventh with the Unified Team in the 1992 Olympic tournament. He played all eight matches.

Clubs
 Dynamo Moscow (1990)
  Halkbank Ankara (1994)

External links
 profile at sports-reference.com

1965 births
2014 deaths
Russian men's volleyball players
Soviet men's volleyball players
Olympic volleyball players of the Soviet Union
Olympic volleyball players of the Unified Team
Volleyball players at the 1988 Summer Olympics
Volleyball players at the 1992 Summer Olympics
Olympic silver medalists for the Soviet Union
Olympic medalists in volleyball
People from Kurgan, Kurgan Oblast
Halkbank volleyball players
Medalists at the 1988 Summer Olympics
Sportspeople from Kurgan Oblast